This is a list of episodes from the anime series Chibi Maruko-chan.

The first series run ran from January 7, 1990 to September 27, 1992, airing a total of 142 episodes, one opening theme, and two ending themes.

The second run began on January 8, 1995 and is still currently airing today. Currently, 1203 episodes have aired.

Series 1 (1990–1992)

1990

1991

1992

Series 2 (1995–present)

1995

1996

1997

1998

1999

2000

2001

2002

2003

2004

2005

2006

2007

2008

2009

2010

2011

2012

2013

2014

2015

2016

2017

2018

2019

References

Chibi Maruko-Chan
Chibi Maruko-chan